The following are the national records in athletics in Spain maintained by its national athletics federation: Real Federación Española de Atletismo (RFEA).

Outdoor

Key to tables:

+ = en route to a longer distance

h = hand timing

A = affected by altitude

Men

Women

Mixed

Indoor

Men

Women

Mixed

Notes

References
General
Spanish Athletics Records - Men Outdoor 20 August 2022 updated
Spanish Athletics Records - Women Outdoor 4 December 2022 updated
Spanish Athletics Records - Indoor 25 February 2023 updated
Specific

External links
 Spanish records at the RFEA website

Spain
Records
Athletics
Athletics